Stanley is a city in Chippewa and Clark counties in the U.S. state of Wisconsin. The population was 3,608 at the 2010 census. Of this, 3,602 were in Chippewa County, and 6 in Clark County.

History 
Stanley was settled and platted in 1881 when the Wisconsin Central Railroad built its line through the area. The town is named for Lemuel C. Stanley, a merchant and railroad man from Chippewa Falls who was involved in that first plat. The main early businesses were a small steam sawmill and some charcoal kilns built by the York Iron Company in 1887.

In 1891 the Northwestern Lumber Company from Eau Claire started a big lumber mill at Stanley. Starting in the 1860s, Northwestern had sawed its lumber at its company town Porter's Mills, on the Chippewa River four miles below Eau Claire. But by the early 1890s Northwestern had exhausted its holdings of timber easy to drive down the river. Timber stands still remained on land away from the rivers, so Northwestern switched its model from river-logging to railroad-logging, and shut down Porter's Mills. The company built a new mill at Stanley and spawned the Stanley, Merrill and Phillips Railway to haul logs out of the country to the north and south. (The railway never reached Merrill or Phillips; its furthest reach was Walrath, to the north of Jump River.) The mill in Stanley sawed wood until 1920, when Northwestern's timber holdings in the area were largely exhausted.  Over that period, the mill is estimated to have sawed 850 million board feet of lumber.

Through the 1890s the population of Stanley increased from 500 to 2500. Stanley became a village in 1895 and a city in 1898. In 1897, attracted by rail connections and the supply of hemlock bark, the U.S. Leather Company opened a tannery in Stanley which employed 200 men and by 1908 tanned 75,000 hides shipped in from Chicago to South America. Stanley's other big early industry was the Big Four Canning Factory on the north side of town, where immigrant farmers brought wagonloads of peas, cabbage, corn and beets grown on the logging cutover. In 1914 Big Four produced up to 100,000 cans of vegetables per day, shipping them all over the country.

On May 18, 1906, a fire started in one of the Northwest Lumber Company buildings east of the current Chapman Lake in what is now Fandry Park.  The fire quickly spread to other businesses and into the residential area to the east.  It ended up destroying a number of business buildings, two churches, and about seventy homes.  But neighbors helped neighbors, businesses rebuilt (some with fireproof brick), and the city moved on. The Northwestern Lumber Company had started a brickyard around 1900, digging its clay north of Chapman Park's location.  After the fire in 1906, production increased greatly to rebuild Stanley and buildings as far off as Eau Claire and Auburndale.

On May 20, 2002, the city annexed a portion of land in the Town of Thorp in Clark County.

On December 15, 2021, an EF 2 tornado went through the city starting southwest and went northeast. It have damaged several buildings including the historic train depot which is now being removed. There was no Injuries/Deaths.

Geography
Stanley is located at  (44.9613, -90.9385).

Stanley is located primarily on the north side of Wisconsin State Highway 29.  It is mostly in Chippewa County, but parts of the east side are in Clark County.

Demographics
	

As of 2000 the median income for a household in the city was $27,644, and the median income for a family was $41,964. Males had a median income of $27,900 versus $21,607 for females. The per capita income for the city was $19,421. About 4.0% of families and 8.0% of the population were below the poverty line, including 10.8% of those under age 18 and 11.2% of those age 65 or over.

2010 census
As of the census of 2010, there were 3,608 people, 930 households, and 532 families residing in the city. The racial makeup of the city was 80.4% White, 16.6% African American, 1.7% Native American, 0.6% Asian, 0.2% Pacific Islander, 0.2% from other races, and 0.3% from two or more races. Hispanic or Latino of any race were 3.1% of the population.

There were 930 households, of which 30.0% had children under the age of 18 living with them, 40.9% were married couples living together, 11.3% had a female householder with no husband present, 5.1% had a male householder with no wife present, and 42.8% were non-families. 37.8% of all households were made up of individuals, and 21.3% had someone living alone who was 65 years of age or older. The average household size was 2.26 and the average family size was 2.96.

The median age in the city was 37.6 years. 15.1% of residents were under the age of 18; 9% were between the ages of 18 and 24; 39.1% were from 25 to 44; 24.9% were from 45 to 64; and 12% were 65 years of age or older. The gender makeup of the city was 68.8% male and 31.2% female.

Healthcare 
Aspirus Stanley Hospital is a 24-bed critical access hospital with a level IV trauma center. The area is located in both a mental health and primary care Health Professional Shortage Area (HPSA) qualifying the area as a medical desert. There are 14.6 primary care physicians per 100,000 population in Stanley compared to the statewide average of 75.6. By 2035, the area is expected to have a 53% deficit in physicians, the fifth largest predicted deficit in Wisconsin. There are no behavioral health physicians in Stanley.

Education
Students residing in Stanley and the neighboring village of Boyd are served by Stanley-Boyd Elementary School, Stanley-Boyd Middle School, and Stanley-Boyd High School. The high school has an enrollment of 332 students. For interscholastic sports, Stanley-Boyd High School is a member of the Cloverbelt Conference of the WIAA.

Stanley Correctional Institution
The city is the site of the Stanley Correctional Institution.

Notable people

 Robert Whitney Burns, U.S. Air Force Lieutenant General
 Dave Cahill, Philadelphia Eagles, Los Angeles Rams, and Atlanta Falcons
 Clarence B. Culbertson, Wisconsin State Representative
 George H. Hipke, Wisconsin State Senator
 Larry Krause, Green Bay Packers
 Vincent Mroz, Secret Service agent
 David Plombon, Wisconsin State Representative
 Terry A. Willkom, Wisconsin State Representative

See also
 List of cities in Wisconsin

References

External links

 
 Sanborn fire insurance maps: 1895 1900 1907 1912 1919

Cities in Chippewa County, Wisconsin
Cities in Clark County, Wisconsin
Cities in Wisconsin
Eau Claire–Chippewa Falls metropolitan area
Populated places established in 1881
1881 establishments in Wisconsin